Trevor Jamieson (born 7 March 1975) is an Aboriginal Australian stage and film actor, playwright, dancer, singer and didgeridoo player.

Early life 
Trevor Jamieson was born on 7 March 1975 in Subiaco, Western Australia (WA).

He grew up in the Western Australian Goldfields region, mostly around Kalgoorlie, Esperance, Western Australia, Norseman, Western Australia, but his people are mostly of the Central Desert, in particular Nullarbor and Maralinga. He has links to Pitjantjara (on his father's side), Kukatja, and other groups, including the Noongar peoples of south-western WA (on his mother's side). His mother was removed from his grandmother by missionaries soon after birth, so as a child he learnt more about his father's side. His father and his grandfather were policemen.

His aunt, Lynette Markle, is the niece of playwright Jack Davis, so he was exposed to drama at an early age, and enjoyed being in a play at school. Thinking about signing up as a constable at the end of 1992, Markle persuaded him to go for an audition, which led to the first step in his career - a role in the stage musical Bran Nue Dae, which toured nationally.

He is a cousin of South Australian actress Natasha Wanganeen.

Career 
Jamieson is an actor, dancer, singer, playwright, and didgeridoo player.

Stage
Jamieson's first stage performance was in the touring producing of Bran Nue Day in 1993. In 1994 he acted in Wild Cat Falling at the Downstairs Theatre at the Belvoir in Sydney. In 1996 he was in Corrugation Road, another musical by Jimmy Chi, this time set in a mental hospital.

He co-wrote The career highlights of the MAMU with Scott Rankin, staged in 2002. This was a dramatisation of the impact of the British nuclear testing at Maralinga, South Australia between 1956 and 1963 on the Indigenous Australians in the region, who were known as the Spinifex people. A video recording was made of the production performed by Black Swan Theatre Company at the Kampnagel theatre in Hamburg, Germany in August 2002. The play was directed by Andrew Ross of Black Swan, and performed at the 2002 Adelaide Festival and the Octagon Theatre at the University of Western Australia (UWA) in May–June 2002, before touring to Mandurah, Margaret River, and Esperance.

He was co-creator of Ngapartji Ngapartji, with Big hART's creative director Scott Rankin. This was a language revitalisation and community development project started in 2005 and which developed into a stage performance as an offshoot. In the theatrical production, Jamieson narrates his family's story. It was performed at the Sydney Opera House and evolved over the years, with performances around the country with changes of cast and script.Ngapartji Ngapartji has toured Australia extensively in between 2005 and 2008 with the show undergoing various developments throughout its production history. In 2012, the show was revived in Canberra in a condensed version under the name Ngapartji Ngapartji One, but Jamieson was not in the cast that year as he was touring with another Big hART production, Namatjira.

In 2012–13 Jamieson played the artist Albert Namatjira in Namatjira, in a performance that was another offshoot of a community project by Big hART, written and directed by Scott Rankin. The play was seen by over 48,000 Australians at its performances at Belvoir and Riverside Theatre Parramatta (Sydney), Malthouse Theatre in Melbourne, and many other theatres on its regional tour of New South Wales, Victoria, South Australia and Tasmania, before touring to London, where it played at the Southbank Centre in November. The play won the 2012 Helpmann Award for Best Regional Touring Production.

In 2013 he took the role of Fingerbone Bill in a stage production of Storm Boy by Barking Gecko Theatre Company and Sydney Theatre Company, based on the 1964 novel by Colin Thiele.

In 2014, Jamieson worked with the Black Arm Band theatre company in a musical theatre production called Dirtsong which closed the 2014 Adelaide Festival on 16 March 2014.The performers, who included Jamieson, Archie Roach, Lou Bennett, Emma Donovan and many other singers and musicians, sang songs with lyrics by writer Alexis Wright, with some sung in Aboriginal languages. The performance included both contemporary and traditional songs, and had premiered five years earlier at the 2009 Melbourne International Arts Festival, with Jamieson not in the original cast.

In 2016, Jamieson participated in a multicultural dance presentation, along with Indian dancers Isha Shavani and Tao Issaro, other Aboriginal dancers, and Maori dancers. The performance was called Kaya, meaning "hello", and it toured regional WA, including Kalgoorlie, before premiering in Perth at the Dolphin Theatre at UWA.

In May 2022 Jamieson played Dugald in a revival of the opera Voss, a co-production by State Opera South Australia and Victorian Opera. Originally scheduled to be performed in Melbourne in August 2021, owing to a COVID-19 pandemic lockdown, the season was cancelled and rescheduled to a single performance at the Adelaide Festival Theatre. The production was well-reviewed, with two critics giving it four out of five stars.

Jameieson acted in the 2013 and 2016 productions of Andrew Bovell's  The Secret River. For the 2017 production at Anstey Hill Quarry for the Adelaide Festival, he arranged the music. The co-production of the State Theatre Company of South Australia and the Sydney Theatre Company, co-directed by Neil Armfield and Geordie Brookman. was a record-breaking success, playing to full houses over 18 nights.

Jamieson's performance in Jada Alberts' Brothers Wreck (2016) was praised. The topic (Indigenous youth suicide) was one for which Jamieson could draw on his own life experiences.

Film and TV 
In 2009, an episode of Message Stick on ABC Television,  called "Spinifex Man", was aired. Filmmaker Allan Collins talks to Jamieson about his life and work in the program.

Jamieson portrayed Fingerbone Bill in the 2019 film Storm Boy, released on 17 January 2019. He loved the 1976 film and especially idolised David Gulpilil (who played Fingerbone Bill), so playing the character in both the stage version in 2013 and this film was a dream come true for him. He consulted Ngarrindjeri / Kaurna elder Moogy Sumner on the singing, dancing, and other cultural protocols, and worked with a Ngarrindjeri linguist to get the language right, as he was representing Ngarrindjeri people in the film, which was shot on Ngarrindjeri country.

Other roles
In 2021, Jamieson was an ambassador for the Revelation Perth International Film Festival.

Recognition and awards
Reviews of his performances have most often been positive. A 2013 review of Namatjira in The Sydney Morning Herald called Jamieson "...one of Australia's leading indigenous actors", and a reviewer wrote in The Adelaide Review in 2018 that he is "a formidable performing talent, writer and dancer".
Awards
2008: Winner, Deadly Awards 2008, Most Outstanding Achievement in Film, TV and Theatre, for Ngapartji Ngapartji
2008: Sydney Theatre Awards, Best Actor in a Lead Role, for Ngapartji Ngapartji]
2010: Nominated, Sydney Theatre Awards, Best Leading Man, for Namatjira

Filmography

Footnotes

References

External links

Trevor Jamieson at AusStage

Living people
1975 births
20th-century Australian male actors
21st-century Australian male actors
Australian male film actors
Australian male television actors
Australian male voice actors
Indigenous Australian male actors
Place of birth missing (living people)
Indigenous Australian dancers
Didgeridoo players
Indigenous Australian musicians